USS Nashawena (AG-142/YAG-35) was a U.S. Navy cable layer constructed during World War II for the Army as the wooden-hulled self-propelled barge BSP 2008. The barge was completed converted to cable work for U.S. Army Signal Corps as the cable ship Col. William. A. Glassford supporting the Alaska Communications System in the shallow island waters of Alaska. She was transferred to the U.S. Navy in 1947 as a miscellaneous auxiliary and assigned to cable-laying duties for the U.S. Pacific Fleet.

The ship was sold to commercial interests in 1960 becoming United States Underseas Cable Corporation's Omega in 1961. Omega did cable work in the Navy's Atlantic Undersea Test and Evaluation Center (AUTEC) and laid shore ends for part of the Air Force's Atlantic Missile Range and the Vietnam Coastal Network connecting coastal centers in Vietnam and a terminus in Thailand. In 1971 the ship, along with the company's larger cable layer were sold to a Liberian registered company set up to buy the two ships. Omega ceased cable operations after the sale and may have been scrapped in 1975.

Construction
The vessel built in 1943 as the Army self propelled barge BSP-2098 by the Seattle Shipbuilding and Dry Dock Corp., Seattle, Washington. The barge was one of two converted to a cable ship to be operated for the U.S. Army Signal Corps as Col. William A. Glassford. The two barges were completed as vessels suited to shallow water work in Alaska with triple screws, two cable tanks capable of holding 400 tons of cable, three  bow sheaves, and a Sundfelt combined paying out-picking up cable machine.

U.S. Army
Col. William A. Glassford and Col. Basil O. Lenoir specialized in cable work in extreme shallow waters in the Alaskan islands. The ships supported the Alaska Communications System for the U.S. Air Force. The wartime cable work in Alaska was so urgent that cable machinery originally intended for the vessel was diverted to equip the cable ship Silverado which Col. William A. Glassford joined in Alaska on completion.

U.S. Navy
The ship was transferred to the U.S. Navy 20 June 1947; and commissioned as Nashawena (AG–142) the same day.

Nashawena soon commenced cable laying and tending services in the 12th Naval District and in the 14th Naval District for the U.S. Naval Electronics Laboratory. Reclassified YAG–35, 9 September 1947, she continued to provide communications maintenance until decommissioned at Mare Island, her homeport 17 August 1953. She was then turned over to the Naval Station, Treasure Island, California, where she operated briefly with the status “in service” before entering the Pacific Reserve Fleet at the end of the year.

Commercial service
Nashawena was sold to Anthony Zahardis, 1 June 1960 and towed from Treasure Island, 3 July, and subsequently struck from the Naval Register. In 1961 ship was owned by United States Underseas Cable Corporation, registered commercially with official number 285876 renamed Omega, and made available for charter.

CS Omega was used for cable work in the Atlantic Undersea Test and Evaluation Center. In 1962 the United States Underseas Cable Corporation won an Air Force contract to lay cable supporting the Atlantic Missile Range. Omega laid all the shore ends of these segments.

Omega laid the shore ends of the Air Force Vietnam Coastal Network system in 1967 at Da Nang, Qui Nhon, Nha Trang, Cam Ranh Bay, Vung Tau, in Vietnam and then at Ban Sattahip, Thailand.

In 1971 the ship was sold to International Marine Operations Inc., registered in Liberia, set up for the purchase of the two Underseas Cable Corporation vessels Neptun and Omega. Omega ceased cable work and may have been scrapped in 1975.

Footnotes

See also
Alaska Communications System
USNS Albert J. Myer

References

External links
 U.S. Armed Forces Cables
 Col. Basil O. Lenoir Photos showing cable work as USAF Col. Basil O. Lenoir in extreme shallow water.
 USS Nashawena (YAG-35) – ex - USS Nashawena (AG-142) (1947 - 1952) - USASPB COL. William Al Glassford (1944 - 1947) NavSource page
 ARC-1, Yamacraw (ARC-5) & Nashawena (AG-142) under "Army Cable Ships" with description of the BSP conversions and image of Col. Basil O. Lenoir at sea

Ships built in Seattle
Cable laying ships
Communications in Alaska
Ships of the United States Army
World War II auxiliary ships of the United States
Cable ships of the United States Navy